The Cystofilobasidiales are an order of fungi in the class Tremellomycetes of the Basidiomycota. They usually exhibit a life phase of free-living yeasts. The order contains two families with seven genera and some 25 species.

References

Tremellomycetes
Basidiomycota orders